Sniper or Snipers is a 2022 Chinese war film directed by Zhang Yimou and Zhang Mo and starring Chen Yongsheng, Zhang Yu, and Zhang Yi. The film is based on a fictionalized account of the real life story of Zhang Taofang, a Chinese sniper fighting American soldiers in the Korean War. The film premiered in China on 1 February 2022, to commemorate PLA Day.

Plot

The story follows members of 5th Squad, 8th Company of the Chinese Army as they fight American soldiers and Snipers in the Korean War.

Cast
 Chen Yongsheng as Zhang Dayong
 Zhang Yu as Liu Wenwu, squad leader of 5th Squad.
 Zhang Yi as Company Commander (special appearance)
 Liu Yitie
 Lin Boyang
 Kenan Heppe
 Kevin Lee
 Wang Ziyi
 Chen Mingyang
 Wang Naixun
 Cheng Hongxin
 Liu Haocun
 AJ Donnelly

Production
Shooting began in Paektu Mountain of Jilin on 6 January 2021.

Music

Release
Sniper was slated for release on 30 July 2021 in China. It was funded by the China Film Administration.

References

External links
 
 
 

2022 films
2020s Mandarin-language films
2020s war films
Chinese war films
Films about snipers
Films shot in Jilin
Korean War films